Choke was the name of a Bristol music collective formed in 2001. It supported D.I.Y music in the city through non-profit events and publications. It was also the name of a related magazine, club night and Internet forum.

The collective hosted Club Choke, a series of live music events featuring local Bristol artists alongside underground acts from other music scenes at venues in Bristol from 2002 - 2006. At its peak, it ran every month for two and a half years at The Croft.
 Choke published a free, photocopied fanzine from 2001 - 2004. It championed bands such as Pricktaster, Chikinki, Madnomad, Gravenhurst, Mooz, Big Joan, Ivory Springer, Bronnt Industries Kapital, SJ Esau, Team Brick and Geisha, Fruit of the Doom, Clayton Blizzard and Hunting Lodge as well as supporting rock, electronic and acoustic acts from the Bristol area and further afield. It was relaunched for a single issue in April 2006.
 The Choke Forum is an Internet forum originally set up by members of the Choke collective to provide an uncensored outlet for online discussion of local music. Since the demise of the zine and club night, the forum has remained a hub for Bristol's independent music scene.

As of 2010 Choke Records was launched with the aim of promoting collaboration and experimentation within Bristols music community. To date the label has released three albums which includes the first Choke release from 2001. 

Musical collectives
Arts organisations based in the United Kingdom
Musical groups established in 2001